Synophis is a genus of snakes in the family Colubridae. The genus is endemic to northwestern South America.

Description
Snakes of the genus Synophis have unusual scalation on the top of the head. The internasal scales are very small, and the prefrontal scales are fused into one large plate.

Species
The genus Synophis contains the following nine species which are recognized as being valid.
Synophis bicolor 
Synophis bogerti 
Synophis calamitus 
Synophis insulomontanus 
Synophis lasallei 
Synophis niceforomariae 
Synophis plectovertebralis 
Synophis zaheri 
Synophis zamora 

Nota bene: A binomial authority in parentheses indicates that the species was originally described in a genus other than Synophis.

References

Further reading
Peracca MG (1896). "Nuovo genere di Colubride aglifo dell'America meridionale ". Bollettino dei Musei di Zoologia ed Anatomia comparata della R[egia]. Università di Torino 11 (266): 1–2. (Synophis, new genus). (in Italian).
Pyron, R. Alexander; Arteaga, Alejandro; Echevarría, Lourdes Y.; Torres-Carvajal, Omar (2016). "A revision and key for the tribe Diaphorolepidini (Serpentes: Dipsadidae) and checklist for the genus Synophis ". Zootaxa 4171 (2): 293–320.

Synophis
Snake genera